The  Lunar basalt 70017   is a Moon rock gathered in 1972 by astronauts Eugene Cernan and Harrison Schmitt on the Apollo 17 mission near their Apollo Lunar Module and then divided into smaller pieces on Earth.

History 

Lunar basalt 70017 is a Moon basalt that was collected by astronauts Eugene Cernan and Harrison Schmitt on the last crewed Moon landing, Apollo 17, when they made a speech referring to "the children of the world". In 1973 President Nixon gave pieces of the lunar basalt 70017 to the 50 United States. Others were given as goodwill gifts by NASA. Some of the displays with the Moon rocks have been stolen, while others have been lost in inventory. NASA still has about 80 percent of the original rock.

Description 

The Apollo 17  "Lunar basalt 70017"  total weight was 2957 grams. It was described by NASA as a "medium-grained high-Ti basalt" with a "crystallization age about 3.7" billion years "and an exposure age about 220" million years.

See also
 List of Apollo lunar sample displays

References

Further reading

External links 

 
Video of the "Goodwill rock" gathered from the Moon

Apollo program lunar sample displays
Apollo program
70017
Lunar science
Petrology
United States–European relations
United States–Central American relations
United States–South American relations
United States–African relations
United States–Asian relations
United States–Caribbean relations
United States–Middle Eastern relations
United States–North American relations
United States–Oceanian relations
Lunar samples
Gene Cernan
Harrison Schmitt
70017
Basalt